Sarah Jane Smith ( Kenyon) (born 8 July 1984) is an Australian professional golfer and LPGA Tour player. She led the 2018 U.S. Women's Open at the halfway point and finished fifth, and was runner-up at the 2014 Kingsmill Championship and the 2016 Lorena Ochoa Invitational.

Amateur career 
Smith started playing golf at the age of 12 and represented Australia at the Astor Trophy, Tasman Cup and the Queen Sirikit Cup.

She was victorious at the 2001 Greg Norman Junior Masters, the 2002 Australian Girls' Amateur and Queensland Junior Championship, and at both the 2003 NSW Stroke Play Championship and Queensland Stroke Play Championship.  

Smith was the top-ranked junior in Australia in 2002 and the top-ranked amateur in 2003. She was the low amateur at the 2004 Women's Australian Open, finishing 10th, and was a member of the Australian World Amateur Team at the 2014 Espirito Santo Trophy.

Professional career 
Smith turned professional in December 2004. Before establishing herself on the LPGA Tour, she won two tournaments on the LPGA Futures Tour.

Her best LPGA Tour results are a runner-up finishes at the 2014 Kingsmill Championship and the 2016 Lorena Ochoa Invitational, and she tied for third at the 2017 ISPS Handa Women's Australian Open. She was on the Australian team that competed at the 2018 International Crown.

She led the 2018 U.S. Women's Open at the halfway point, and finished tied fifth after a final round 78.

Smith also played on the ALPG Tour. In 2017, she was runner-up at the RACV Gold Coast Challenge and won the season money list. She shot 63-65 at the 2023 TPS Murray River, a mixed-gender event with the 2022–23 PGA Tour of Australasia, to win by five shots over Andrew Martin and Shae Wools-Cobb, snapping her 15-year victory drought.

Personal life 
Smith competed as Sarah-Jane Kenyon until she married professional caddie Duane Smith on 10 January 2009. She went on maternity leave in April 2019 and gave birth to a son, Theo.

Amateur wins
2001 Greg Norman Junior Masters
2002 Australian Girls' Amateur, Queensland Junior Championship
2003 NSW Stroke Play Championship, Queensland Stroke Play Championship 

Source:

Professional wins (3)

Futures Tour wins (2)
2005 Greater Tampa Duramed FUTURES Classic
2008 Twin Bridges Championship

WPGA Tour of Australasia wins (1)

Results in LPGA majors
Results not in chronological order.

^ The Evian Championship was added as a major in 2013.

CUT = missed the half-way cut
NT = no tournament
T = tied

Team appearances
Amateur
Astor Trophy (representing Australia): 2003
Tasman Cup (representing Australia): 2003
Queen Sirikit Cup (representing Australia): 2004
Espirito Santo Trophy (representing Australia): 2004

Professional
The Queens (representing ALPG): 2015, 2016, 2017
International Crown (representing Australia): 2018

References

External links

Sarah Jane Smith at the WPGA Tour of Australasia official site

Australian female golfers
LPGA Tour golfers
ALPG Tour golfers
Sportspeople from Geelong
1984 births
Living people